Wolf Lowry is a 1917 silent film western directed by and starring William S. Hart. It was produced at Kay-Bee Studios and released by Triangle Film Corporation.

A surviving film with prints at the Library of Congress, George Eastman House and UCLA Film and Television.

Cast
 William S. Hart as Tom "Wolf" Lowry
 Aaron Edwards as Buck Fanning
 William Fairbanks as Owen Thorpe (billed as Carl Ullman)
 Margery Wilson as Mary Davis

References

External links
 
 

1917 films
1917 Western (genre) films
Films directed by William S. Hart
Triangle Film Corporation films
American black-and-white films
Silent American Western (genre) films
1910s American films